Belarusian State Technological University is a university in Minsk, Belarus specialized in engineering and technology.  It was established in Gomel in 1930 as the Forestry Institute. In 1941, it was evacuated to Sverdlovsk, now Yekaterinburg. Returned to Gomel in 1944, but in 1946 relocated to Minsk as the Belarusian Institute of Technology.

Structure
47 departments
11 faculties
Dean's office for foreign students
Pre-University courses
Negoreloe forestry experimental station
Botanical garden
Meteorological station
Educational-production forest-processing complex
Borisov educational-scientific experimental station
Technological gymnasium

Prominent alumni
Yuri Puntus - former BATE Borisov and Belarus national football team coach.

References

Universities and institutes established in the Soviet Union
Universities in Minsk
Educational institutions established in 1930
1930 establishments in Belarus
Engineering universities and colleges